The 1945 Swedish Ice Hockey Championship was the 23rd season of the Swedish Ice Hockey Championship, the national championship of Sweden. Hammarby IF won the championship.

Tournament

First Qualification round 
 Åkers IF - Stallarholmens AIF 7:1
 Södertälje IF - IFK Tumba 7:4
 Strands IF – IK Warpen 8:3
 IK Huge - Gefle IF 8:7
 Uddens IF - IF Fellows 1:4
 IF Göta Karlstad - Forshaga IF 9:0
 Sandvikens IF - Strömsbro IF 7:2
 BK Forward - IF Eyra 2:2/6:4
 Atlas Diesels IF - Stockholms IF 6:3
 Karlbergs BK - Reymersholms IK 4:0
 AIK - IFK Lidingö 10:1
 Tranebergs IF - Årsta SK 4:3
 Västerås SK - IF Aros 5:3
 Skuru IK - IFK Stockholm 0:6

Second Qualification round 
 Skellefteå IF - IFK Nyland 4:3
 Wifsta/Östrands IF - Strands IF 4:3
 Sörhaga IK - IF Fellows 4:3
 IFK Mariefred - Åkers IF 7:2
 Brynäs IF - IK Huge 4:5
 Mora IK - Sandvikens IF 6:5
 IF Göta Karlstad - BJ Forward 4:0
 VIK Västerås HK - Västerås SK 3:5
 UoIF Matteuspojkarna - Södertälje IF 9:3
 Tranebergs IF - Atlas Diesel 5:3
 IFK Stockholm - Karlbergs BK 0:3
 IF Vesta - AIK (W)

1/8 Finals 
 Hammarby IF - Västerås SK 10:3 
 Wifsta/Östrands IF - Skellefteå IF 6:4  
 IK Göta - Nacka SK 3:2
 Karlbergs BK - Mora IK 6:2 
 Södertälje SK - Tranebergs IF 10:2
 UoIF Matteuspojkarna - IFK Mariefred 6:3
 AIK - IK Huge 18:3
 IF Göta Karlstad - Sörhaga IK 8:1

Quarterfinals 
 Hammarby IF - Wifsta/Östrands IF 6:0  
 IK Göta - Karlbergs BK 4:3
 Södertälje SK - UoIF Matteuspojkarna 3:0
 AIK - IF Göta Karlstad 17:0

Semifinals
 Hammarby IF - IK Göta 4:3 n.V.
 Södertälje SK - AIK 6:3 n.V.

Final
 Hammarby IF - Södertälje SK 3:2 n.V.

External links
 Season on hockeyarchives.info

Cham
Swedish Ice Hockey Championship seasons